École supérieure d'ingénieurs des travaux de la construction de Caen (ESITC Caen) a French engineering College created in 1993.

The school trains engineers for the construction industry and with the support of local authorities.

Located in Caen, the ESITC Caen is a private higher education institution of general interest recognised by the State. The school is a member of the Union of Independent Grandes Écoles (UGEI).

References

External links
 ESITC Caen

Engineering universities and colleges in France
ESITC Caen
Caen
Educational institutions established in 1993
1993 establishments in France